Kenan & Kel is an American television sitcom created by Kim Bass that premiered on Nickelodeon on July 15, 1996, and ran for 65 episodes over four seasons. Set in Chicago, Illinois, the series follows the misadventures of two high-school-aged teenagers, Kenan Rockmore (Kenan Thompson) and Kel Kimble (Kel Mitchell). Episodes typically begin with the events leading to and, subsequently, the consequences of Kenan's half-thought-out scams, which the nimble-minded foil Kel invariably follows. Other major characters in the series include Kenan's parents, his younger sister, and his boss at Rigby's, a local grocery store. The series finale, a television film titled Two Heads Are Better Than None, aired on July 15, 2000.

Series overview

Episodes

Season 1 (1996–97)

Season 2 (1997)

Season 3 (1998–99)

Season 4 (1999–2000)

References

Lists of American sitcom episodes
Lists of American children's television series episodes
Lists of Nickelodeon television series episodes